The European Federation for Welding, Joining and Cutting (EWF) is an organization dedicated to education, training, qualification and certification in the field of welding and related technologies.

History 
In 1992, welding course providers of several EU countries wanted to harmonise their education, training, qualification and certification procedures. Thus, they set-up the European Federation for Welding, Joining and Cutting (EWF). The objective was that same qualifications could be awarded in any country by using a single syllabus for each level of the training course and a harmonised system for examinations. EWF developed a comprehensive and harmonised system for training, qualification and certification of welding personnel and managed its application ever since. It took a leading role in the innovation of learning methodologies. It is also responsible for the certification system of companies that use welding, focussing on quality, environment, health and safety.

The challenges addressed by EWF are two-fold: Respond to industry's professional profile requirements and provide courses that leverage current technological trends and their impact on evolving lifestyles and information acquisition patterns.

Currently,(2018) EWF has members from 28 European countries and two observer members from outside Europe, represented by their national welding societies: Austria, Belgium, Bulgaria, Croatia, Czech Republic, Denmark, Finland, France, Germany, Greece, Hungary, Iran, Italy, Luxembourg, Netherlands, Norway, Poland, Portugal, Romania, Serbia, Slovakia, Slovenia, Spain, Sweden, Switzerland, Turkey, Ukraine and the United Kingdom, as well as Kazakhstan and the Russian Federation.

Over the years, EWF has taken an important role in the welding, joining and related technologies community. It prepares and disseminates information on vocational, educational, training and research and technological development, to keep the community abreast of the most recent developments relevant to its core goals. It also manages collaborative projects about these issues and takes part in these.

EWF is closely monitoring the unfolding trends that are shaping Europe's and the world's manufacturing, as well as working side-by-side with the European thought leaders that are defining the region's industrial future. The Federation's long-term commitment to drive the state-of-the-art in qualifications has led to the exploration of the most recent and advanced ICT tools, enhancing digital integration in learning, teaching, training and youth work at various levels, including online, webinars and other new forms of training.

Mission and vision 
"To provide world-class, European focused, value-added products and support services to its members and their communities in the fields of joining, welding and related technologies on an international basis."

The cornerstones underlying the long-term vision and strategy of EWF are as follows:

• Ensure that the training and qualification system is updated to comply with technical innovation and industrial demand;

• Develop new qualifications in line with technological and industrial advances;

• Provide a pathway for continuous professional development for professionals in manufacturing;

• Ensure the quality of the EWF diplomas, by running a rigorous quality assurance system in the countries throughout the world that are using the system.

EWF system 
Developing a mutually accepted International System for Training Qualification and Certification of both welding personnel and companies using welding, has made EWF a pioneer organization responding to one of the most demanding markets needs, the need for qualified personnel. The EWF system was the first system embracing all the European countries for the qualification of personnel for a wide range of levels in welding, related technologies and inspection.

Beyond the most obvious benefits of the system's harmonised approach to training, qualification and certification, its adoption is also due to a result of its robust and transparent quality system, one that is widely accepted by the individuals and organisations involved, from training institutions to national certification bodies, companies, trainers and trainees, and which is the backbone for assuring the same skills for any person holding an EWF diploma, awarded throughout the world.

The EWF training, qualification and certification system serves the worldwide welding industry. On the European level, it can be used by the EWF members, while at the international level it can be used by the IIW-IAB members.

EWF/IIW network 
The federation licensed its qualification system to IIW (International Institute of Welding) in 2000, and since then a combined EWF/IIW System has been offered in 46 countries worldwide, totalling 44 ANBs (Authorized National Bodies) and 683 ATBs (Authorised Training Bodies).

The network also includes 55,000 companies worldwide.

A certification system has been developed to guarantee manufacturer compliance with EN ISO 3834 and environmental and health safety schemes and its implementation is harmonized within EWF members.

Organization
The EWF has a General Assembly, a Board of Directors, a Secretariat and a Technical Committee with five working groups.

The EWF is governed by the General Assembly, which is representative of the member organizations. The General Assembly, composed of the members of the association, has full powers for accomplishing the objectives of the association.

The General Assembly is responsible for electing its president and a Board of Directors.

The Secretariat is elected for a period of 5 years by the General Assembly from among the proposals made by the full members, in accordance with the criteria established by the General Assembly. []

The EWF Technical Committee is set up by the General Assembly for covering a technical area related to training, qualification and certification in the welding and joining fields, implying a continuous activity, without any time limit, and consists of the Chairman, the representatives of the members and Working Groups.

Key activities

Education, training and qualification of personnel 
The EWF qualification system has several types of professional training covering welding, bonding and related techniques. This harmonised system of education and training has been adopted by IIW as an international qualification system since 2000. Its relevance has been recognised both by ISO and CEN that have EWF as a liaison member. These different technologies, like particular processes, require that the quality of the product must be incorporated during the manufacturing/maintenance, and cannot be ensured only by final testing. That entails personnel with particular high level of knowledge, skills and competences which can be obtained through the EWF qualification system.

There are three pillars which support the EWF Harmonised International Qualification System:

 Technical Committee: Harmonised qualification guidelines, rules and procedures are developed and approved by all members
 The National Member: Responsible for the supervision and implementation of the system through the Authorised Nominated Body (ANB)
 The Approved Training Centers: Approved Training Bodies (ATBs) implement the qualification guidelines

In 2012, on its annual report about international qualifications, the European Center for the Development of Vocational Training (CEDEFOP), has considered the EWF qualification system as the best-case example, recognising the ground-breaking work done by EWF on creating a qualification framework which has been globally adopted.

EWF training guidelines 

The EWF training guidelines cover all professional levels in welding technology and related areas, such as thermal spraying, adhesive bonding, plastics welding and underwater welding, leading to recognised qualifications in 30 European countries and also at international level. They can be listed as follows:

 European/International Welding Engineer
 European/International Welding Technologist
 European/International Welding Specialist
 European/International Welding Practitioner
 European/International Welding Inspection Personnel
 European/International Welder
 European Arc Welder for Railway Tracks
 European Thermal Spraying Specialist
 European Thermal Sprayer
 European Thermal Spraying Practitioner
 European Adhesive Bonder
 European Adhesive Specialist
 European Adhesive Engineer
 European Welding Specialist for Resistance Welding
 European Welding Practitioner for Resistance Welding
 European MMA Diver Welder
 European Aluminothermic Welder
 European Laser Processing Personnel
 Special Course for Robot Welding at the Specialist Level
 Special Course for Welding Reinforcing Bars at the Specialist level
 Special Course on Weld Imperfections for Non-Destructive Testing Personnel
 Special Course on Personnel with responsibility for Macroscopic and Microscopic Metallographic Examination of Structural Materials and their Joints Prepared/Produced by Welding and Allied Techniques
 Special Course on Personnel with Responsibility for Heat Treatment of Welded Joints
 Special Course on Risk Management in Welding Fabrication

Details about the courses are available in the EWF Qualifications Guidelines Catalogue.

Certification of welding personnel  
Three certification schemes for personnel have been developed:

• Welding Coordination Certification exists since 1998 and was adopted by IIW in 2007 and is currently recognised worldwide, allowing Welding Coordinators to be certified according to the requirement of ISO 14731.

• Plastic Welders Certification exists since 2004, providing training and certification according to EN 13067.

• Welders Operators and Brazers Certification exist since 2010. The goal of this scheme is to harmonise the welder's certification process necessary for a welder approval.

Certification of companies 
EWF has created an integrated Manufacturers Certification Scheme, which complies with ISO 3834 on welding quality requirements, which is in place since 1998, ISO 14001 and OSHAS 18001 on environment and also health and safety, which are in place since 2000. The scheme has been adopted by IIW, only for the quality field.

Projects
A good part of EWF's activities have been related to its participation in European cooperation projects, in particular under the European Commission's programmes such as Lifelong Learning 2007-2013, 7th Framework Programme, Erasmus+ and H2020.

Project focus on modernisation of teaching methods, harmonisation of qualifications, support for learning, implementation and benchmark to other teaching areas and cover a variety of areas like additive manufacturing, health and safety, microbonding, laser processing and adhesives that go beyond welding and joining but target manufacturing as a whole.

Products 
EWF has been developing support tools for its members and the industry, in particular related to the implementation of new standards, translation of welding terminology, training materials and new areas where there is a need for new products and services.

EMFWeld

EMFWeld is an online service, which assesses workers’ exposure to magnetic fields generated by welding and inspection equipment in compliance with Directive 2013/35/EU.

Weld Play

The Weld Play game was developed to provide especially children and young people with accessible, interesting tools to introduce them to the welding industry. In the game, the player is the manager of a welding company. By virtually purchasing goods, hiring staff, meeting contract requirements and developing experience, the player's objective is to bring the company to pole position within the welding sector. As well as teaching about several aspects of welding, the game also demonstrates a variety of basic management principles.
 
Welding Dictionary App

The Welding Dictionary App contains more than 200 welding terms in different languages supported by 300 photos and videos. This application is a tool for anyone interested in welding, from curious learners to welding professionals.

References

External links
 

Welding organizations
Welding
Vocational education